Hellinsia kaiapensis is a species of moth in the genus Hellinsia, known from Papua New Guinea. Moths in this species take flight in November, and have a wingspan of approximately 17 millimetres. The specific name "kaiapensis" refers to Kaiap, the type locality for the species.

References

kaiapensis
Insects of Papua New Guinea
Moths described in 2003
Moths of New Guinea